Kingdom is an anime adaptation of a manga series of the same title written and illustrated by Yasuhisa Hara. At the end of the third season's final episode, a fourth season was announced, and aired from April 10 to October 2, 2022. The cast returned to reprise their roles. The opening theme is "Rei -ray-" performed by Suiren while the ending theme is "Genyou (Dazzling)" performed by Haku.  The second opening theme is "geki" performed by zonji, while the second ending theme is "Believe" performed by Misaki.


Episode list

Notes

References

2022 Japanese television seasons
Kingdom episode lists